The Chillington Iron Works opened in 1822. Foster, Rastrick and Company in Stourbridge played a role in equipping the works. An extensive  gauge tramway connected the ironworks with the Birmingham canal at Chillington Wharf, but had disappeared by the turn of the century. Steam locomotives from John Smith Village Foundry at Coven, were purchased for use on the line.

References

Rail transport in Wolverhampton
Industrial railways in England